Francesco Esposito (born 4 March 1955) is a multiple world championship rower from Italy. He competed at the 1984 Summer Olympics held at Lake Casitas in the United States, where he came fifth with Ruggero Verroca in the double sculls. He was one of three recipients of the Thomas Keller Medal in 1996.

References

1955 births
Living people
Italian male rowers
Olympic rowers of Italy
Rowers at the 1984 Summer Olympics
World Rowing Championships medalists for Italy
Thomas Keller Medal recipients
20th-century Italian people
21st-century Italian people